The 1997 NCAA Men's Water Polo Championship was the 29th annual NCAA Men's Water Polo Championship to determine the national champion of NCAA men's collegiate water polo. Tournament matches were played at the International Swimming Hall of Fame Aquatics Complex in Fort Lauderdale, Florida, during December 1997.

Pepperdine defeated USC in the final, 8–7 (in two overtimes), to win their first national title. The Waves (25–3) were coached by Terry Schroeder.

The Most Outstanding Players of the tournament, all from Pepperdine, were Alan Herrmann, Merrill Moses, and Jeremy Pope. The All-Tournament Team comprised these three, along with four other players.

The tournament's leading scorer, with 6 goals, was Pope from Pepperdine.

Queens (NY) became the first team from outside the state of California to finish third place in an NCAA men's water polo tournament. The Knights defeated UC Davis in the third-place final, 5–3.

Qualification
Since there has only ever been one single national championship for water polo, all NCAA men's water polo programs (whether from Division I, Division II, or Division III) were eligible. A total of 4 teams were invited to contest this championship.

Bracket
Site: International Swimming Hall of Fame Aquatics Complex, Fort Lauderdale, Florida

All-tournament team 
Simun Cimerman, USC
Mike Gottelli, UC Davis
Alan Herrmann, Pepperdine (Most outstanding player)
Merrill Moses, Pepperdine (Most outstanding player)
Marko Pintaric, USC
Jeremy Pope, Pepperdine (Most outstanding player)
John Vasek, Queens (NY)

See also 
 NCAA Men's Water Polo Championship

References

NCAA Men's Water Polo Championship
NCAA Men's Water Polo Championship
1997 in sports in Florida
December 1990 sports events in the United States
1997